Isaac "Ike" Robinson (16 July 1915 – 1979) was an English professional footballer who played as a full-back.

References

1915 births
1979 deaths
Sportspeople from Bishop Auckland
Footballers from County Durham
English footballers
Association football fullbacks
Brotherton Colliery Welfare F.C. players
Leeds United F.C. players
Scarborough F.C. players
Grimsby Town F.C. players
Boston United F.C. players
English Football League players